Aleksandr Viktorovich Ustinov (26 January 1968 – 16 December 1996) was a Russian rower. He competed in the men's lightweight coxless four event at the 1996 Summer Olympics. He died in a car crash in his home city Kazan not long after his Olympic appearance.

References

External links
 
 

1968 births
1996 deaths
Russian male rowers
Olympic rowers of Russia
Rowers at the 1996 Summer Olympics
Sportspeople from Kazan